Henry Hall may refer to:

Politics and government 
 Henry Hall (MP), in 1601 MP for City of York
 Henry Charles Hall (1883–1962), Canadian politician
 Henry Clay Hall (1860–1936), attorney and member of the Interstate Commerce Commission appointed by President Wilson
 Lyall Hall (Henry Lyall Hall, 1861–1935), member of the West Australian parliament

Entertainment 
 Henry Hall (bandleader) (1898–1989), British bandleader
 Henry Hall (actor) (1876–1954), American actor, including in The Secret Witness
 Henry Hunter Hall (born 1997), American actor
 Henry Richard Hall (1920–1999), American actor better known as Huntz Hall

Arts and literature 
 Henry Hall (poet) (died 1707), English poet and composer
 Henry Robinson Hall (1859–1927), British painter
 Henry Bryan Hall (1808–1884), English stipple engraver and portrait painter

Academia 
 Henry Hall (physicist) (1928–2015), British physicist
 Henry Hall (Egyptologist) (1873–1930), British Egyptologist
 Henry Usher Hall (1876–1944), American anthropologist

Sports 
 Henry Hall (cricketer, born 1810) (1810–1864), Yorkshire cricketer
 Henry Hall (Somerset cricketer) (1857–1934)
 Henry Hall (skier) (1893-1986), American ski jumper
 Henry Hall (British boxer) (1922–1979), British boxer
 Henry Hall (American boxer) (1922-2016), American boxer
 Henry Hall (footballer) (born 1945), Scottish former football player and manager

Other 
 Henry Hall (Covenanter) (died 1680)
 Henry Hall (lighthouse keeper) (1661–1755), English lighthouse keeper
 Henry Hall (lawyer) (fl. 1670–1692), English lawyer, High Sheriff and Fellow of the Royal Society.
 Henry Hall (American revolution), fought in the American Revolutionary War and began the commercial cultivation of the cranberry
 Henry Hall (farmer) (1802–1880), Australian farmer
 Henry Hall (priest) (1734–1815), Archdeacon of Dorset
 Henry Seymour Hall (1835–1908), Union Army officer in the American Civil War
 Henry Hall (bishop) (died 1663), English Anglican priest in Ireland
 Henry R. Hall (1917–2012), involved in Scouting

See also
 Harry Hall (disambiguation)